The following is a list of fictional astronauts performing or attempting feats beyond the capabilities of the present or near future, such as interstellar travel.

Far Future

Notes

References

Lists of fictional astronauts